Edern is a commune in the Finistère department of Brittany in northwestern France.

Geography

Climate
Edern has a oceanic climate (Köppen climate classification Cfb).

Population
Inhabitants of Edern are called in French Édernois.

See also
Communes of the Finistère department

References

External links

Official website 

Mayors of Finistère Association 

Communes of Finistère